Calisto hysius is a butterfly of the family Nymphalidae. It is endemic to Hispaniola.

The wingspan is 16.5–17.5 mm.

The larvae feed on various grasses.

Subspecies
Calisto hysius hysius
Calisto hysius aleucosticha Correa & Schwartz, 1986

References

Calisto (butterfly)
Butterflies of the Caribbean
Fauna of Hispaniola
Endemic fauna of Haiti
Endemic fauna of the Dominican Republic
Butterflies described in 1824